Sunnyland may refer to:

Place
Sunnyland, Illinois, a census-designated place

Music
"Sunnyland", a song by Elmore James
Sunnyland, a 2006 album by Edward Gerhard
Sunnyland, a 2009 album by Zora Young
Sunnyland (Mayday Parade album), a 2018 album by Mayday Parade

See also
 Sunnylands, an estate in Rancho Mirage, California
 Sunnyland Slim